Mt. Ararat High School is a  high school in Topsham, Maine, United States. It is part of Maine School Administrative District 75 and it is the only high school in that district.

History

In 1973, Mt. Ararat High School, then known as Mt. Ararat School, and assigned building number 73 to commemorate the year of launch, opened its doors to serve the needs of the students of its four sending towns: Bowdoin, Bowdoinham, Harpswell, and Topsham, Maine. For the first 22 years of its existence, the school provided education to students in grades 7-12.  Starting in Fall 1995, due to overcrowding, middle school students in grades 7 and 8 attended school at a newly formed Mt. Ararat Middle School, first housed in the old Brunswick High School building, in the nearby town of Brunswick. At that time, the name of the original school was changed to Mt. Ararat High School. In 2001, middle school students, faculty, and staff moved into a brand new building of their own, now the official Mt. Ararat Middle School. The name Mt. Ararat School was taken from the name of the hill that lies behind the school, the site of a fire tower, with a cell tower at its crest. The old school's address of 73 Eagles Way, was first used in the late 1990s, which remained the name of the old school's address until it was demolished in 2020. The name was in honor of the school's inaugural year and the school's mascot.

In August 2010, MSAD No. 75 received acceptance on an application to the state to either renovate or build a new high school. Then superintendent, Brad Smith presented the district as hoping to be eligible for building a new school. The location for the new high school was to be the athletic fields. The plans for the new high school were approved in 2017 and construction began in 2018. On September 8, 2020 the new Mt. Ararat High School opened its doors to students for the first time.

The new Mt. Ararat High School was completed in 2020, and the former building was demolished that same year.

Students and faculty

As of 2021, Mt. Ararat High School has approximately 865 students and 126 faculty members. The principal is Mr. Chris Hoffman, and the two assistant principals are currently Mr. Deron Sharp and Mrs. Alison Pols.

Notable alumni
Linda Greenlaw, author and boat captain
Mark Rogers, former professional baseball player.
 William "Billy" Edward Price, co-starred in a short film, which was filmed there called Bugcrush in 2006, and starred in a documentary called Billy The Kid in 2007, which was also partially filmed there.
Carter Smith, movie director whose first film, Bugcrush was filmed there. Later went on to direct The Ruins (film).

School colors and mascot

Mt. Ararat High School's colors are royal blue, red, and white. Its mascot is the bald eagle.

Athletics 

Mt. Ararat has a rich history in athletics, and has earned multiple state titles in various sports. The school is a member of the Kennebec Valley Athletic Conference, and touts a fierce rivalry with Brunswick High School, located on the other side of the Androscoggin River. As well as a rivalry with Morse High School. The current athletic director is Mr. Geoff Godo.

Men's soccer - The men's soccer team has reached the Class A State Final six times. The team took home the gold ball in 1994 with a victory over Portland, and in 2003 with a victory over Scarborough.

Women's Soccer - The women's soccer team has reached the Class A State Final ten times, coming away with the state title seven times. The most recent title came in 2003 with a victory over Greely. 

Men's Baseball - The Eagles reached the Class A State Title game twice. In 2004, Mt. Ararat pitcher Mark Rogers was drafted 5th overall by the Milwaukee Brewers in the Major League Baseball Draft and was also the 2004 National Gatorade Player of the Year.

Softball - The Eagles reached the Maine State Class A title game twice.

Women's Track & Field - The Eagles have won three different Maine State Class A Titles, coming in 1975, 1992, and 2005. Cuyler Goodwin holds the state record in the Girls 400 m dash (57.17) set in 1994. Jen Moreau held the 1600 m run (4:57.27) record for 10 years until it was broken in 2009 by Abbey Leonardi of Kennebunk with a time of 4:56.64. Additionally, the Eagles have won three different Maine State Class A Indoor titles, coming in 1993, 1994, and 1997. Cuyler Goodwin holds the retired 300-yard state record of 37.37.

Women's cross-country - The women's cross-country team has won two state titles, winning in 1992 and 2004.

Men's cross-country – The men's two cross-country state titles came in 1994 and 2019. They won KVAC's and Eastern Maine Regionals in 2010 and KVAc's and regional in 2019, and were state runners-up in 2010.

Gymnastics - Though the Eagles have never won a state title, they did have two "All-Around" champions. In 1996, Heather Burke took home the honor, and in 1997, Brianna Fuller did the same.

Men's tennis - Though they have not won a state title, the Eagles' Mike Hill won three Men's Singles state championship titles (2007, 2008, and 2009). Nick Mathieu won back to back Class A State Singles titles in 2016 and 2017, while also visited the finals in both 2014 and 2015.

Women's tennis - The women's tennis team reached the Maine State Class A final match three different times, claiming victory twice. In 2004, they defeated Deering High School, and in 2005, they repeated, defeating Deering High School again. The Eagles finished as runners-up in 2001 to Lewiston High School.

Wrestling - In 1996, the Eagles finished as the Class A State runner-up, falling to Bonny Eagle High School in the state final. A lot of individual wrestlers go to the state championship. In 2019, the combined Mt. Ararat/Brunswick wrestling team became Class A State champions.

Women's lacrosse - The women's lacrosse team reached the Maine State Class A Final in 2010, falling to Scarborough High School 11–7.

Football - The Football team reached the Maine State Class 8 Man state championship in 2019, Winning their first ever football state title over Old Orchard Beach High school 58-25. Mt. Ararat's Holden Brannan rushed for over 300 yards with 7 touchdowns.

References

External links

Public high schools in Maine
Schools in Sagadahoc County, Maine
Topsham, Maine
Buildings and structures in Topsham, Maine
1973 establishments in Maine